The women's vault gymnastics competition at the 2013 Summer Universiade was held on July 10 at the Gymnastics Centre in Kazan.

Results

External links
2013 Summer Universiade – Artistic gymnastics

Women's vault